Aeromist-Kharkiv or Aeromost-Kharkov was an airline headquartered in Kharkiv, Ukraine, operating scheduled and chartered regional flights out of its base at Kharkiv International Airport using a fleet of up to three Antonov An-140 aircraft, the first ones of that type to enter commercial airline service (registered UR-14002, UR-14003 and UR-14004). The company was established on 6 June 2002 under Pavlo Naumenko's initiative (back then president of InterAMI). It ceased operations in June 2007 (at that time, the website was shut down).

Destinations

Aeromist offered scheduled passenger flights to the following destinations:
Armenia
Yerevan - Zvartnots International Airport
Georgia
Batumi - Batumi International Airport
Russia
Moscow - Domodedovo International Airport
Slovakia
Bratislava - M. R. Štefánik Airport
Ukraine
Kharkiv - Kharkiv International Airport (base)
Kyiv - Kyiv International Airport (Zhuliany)

Accidents and incidents
On 23 December 2002 at 19:29 local time, an Aeromist Antonov An-140 (registered UR-14003) crashed into a mountain near Isfahan, Iran, whilst approaching Isfahan International Airport in poor visibility conditions. The aircraft had been operating 'Flight 2137', a chartered service from Kharkiv to Isfahan with a refueling stop at Trabzon Airport, carrying 38 passengers (all of which were Antonov employees heading for a test flight of the HESA IrAn-140) and 6 crew members, none of which survived. It was later determined that the most probable reason for the crash was the flawed usage of the onboard GPS by the pilots. The accident marked the first, and to date the worst accident involving an aircraft of that type.

References

External links

Defunct airlines of Ukraine
Airlines established in 2002
Airlines disestablished in 2007
Ukrainian companies established in 2002